The 2003 Wychavon District Council election took place on 1 May 2003 to elect members of Wychavon District Council in Worcestershire, England. The whole council was up for election with boundary changes since the last election in 1999 reducing the number of seats by four. The Conservative party stayed in overall control of the council.

Background
Before the election the Conservatives controlled the council with 33 councillors, while the Liberal Democrats had 10 seats, Labour had 3, there was 1 independent and 2 seats were vacant. Boundary changes since 1999 reduced the number of wards from 36 to 32 and the number of councillors fell by four. Although all of the seats on the council were up for election, in Norton and Whittington, and Pinvin, there was no election as there was only one candidate in each ward.

One-third of the Conservative councillors stood down at the election, as well as independent John Smith who had represented Pershore on Wychavon District Council from its first election in 1973.

Election result
The Conservatives remained in control of the council after winning 31 of the 45 seats on the council. The Liberal Democrats remained the largest opposition with 12 seats, while Labour took two seats. Overall turnout at the election was 37.94%, almost 4% higher than at the 1999 election.

Among the defeated candidates was the Labour leader on Worcestershire County Council, Peter Pinfield, who lost in Droitwich East. Meanwhile, the Conservative leader of the council, Malcolm Meikle, held his seat by 39 votes and the Liberal Democrat group leader, Margaret Rowley was elected by 19 votes after recounts in both wards. However the Conservatives did lose seats in Pershore, where the Liberal Democrats won all three seats for the ward.

Ward results

References

2003
2003 English local elections
2000s in Worcestershire